Beit Imrin (transliterated as "House of Princes") is a Palestinian village in the Nablus Governorate in northern West Bank, located 18 kilometers northwest of Nablus. According to the Palestinian Central Bureau of Statistics (PCBS), the village had a population of 2,821  inhabitants in 2007.

Beit Imrin is an agricultural village with the main products being pulses, grains, vegetables, olives, grapes, almonds and figs. There is a girls' primary school and a boys' secondary school in the village. Other public facilities include a health clinic, telephone and postal services.

History
Ceramics from the Byzantine and early Islamic periods have been found here.

According to the Beit Imrin Village Council, Beit Imrin was founded by Arabs from nearby Burqa and the Bani Hassan tribe of Transjordan, whose members also populated Qarawat Bani Hassan. The town of Sebastia is located to the southwest, the villages of Ijnisinya and Nisf Jubeil to the south, Burqa to the northwest and Yasid to the east.

Ottoman era
In 1517, Beit Imrin was incorporated into the Ottoman Empire with the rest of Palestine. In 1596, it appeared in Ottoman tax registers as a village in the nahiya (subdistrict) of Jabal Sami in the Nablus Sanjak. It had a population of 19 households and 2 bachelors, all Muslim, and paid taxes on wheat, barley, summer crops, olive trees, occasional revenues, goats and beehives, and a press for olives or grapes; a total of  13,200 akçe.

In 1667 there was a Greek Orthodox community in the village.

In 1838 American Biblical scholar Edward Robinson noted that the village was on the road to Jenin. He also noted that the village had a mixture of Greek Christians and Muslim inhabitants. At this time the village had 50 Christians and a priest.

In 1870, Victor Guérin estimated that Beit Imrin had 700 inhabitants. He further noted: "The houses are small and roughly built, except the Sheikh’s house, which is large and well-built. Below the village and to the west there is a fertile valley irrigated by a spring called Ain Dilbeh."

In 1882, the PEF's Survey of Western Palestine (SWP) described it as "a village of moderate size in the valley at the foot of the Sheikh Beiyzid chain. It is built of stone, and has a spring in the valley to the south, and olives round it on the east and west. Some of the inhabitants are Greek Christians."

British Mandate era
In the 1922 census of Palestine conducted by the British Mandate authorities, Beit Imrin had a population of 527; 512 Muslims and  15 Christians, where the Christians were all Orthodox. The population increased in the 1931 census to 620, of whom 13 were Christians and 607 Muslims, in a total of 157 occupied houses.

In the 1945 statistics, the population was 860, all Muslims, with 12,094 dunams of land, according to an official land and population survey. Of this, 1,442 dunams were for plantations or irrigated land, 6,819 for cereals, while 53 dunams were built-up (urban) land.

Jordanian era
In the wake of the 1948 Arab–Israeli War, and after the 1949 Armistice Agreements, Beit Imrin came under Jordanian rule. It was annexed by Jordanin 1950.

In 1961, the population of Beit Imrin was  1,048.

Post-1967
Since the Six-Day War in 1967, the village has been under Israeli occupation. A census that same year recorded the population as 1,100.

After the 1995 accords, 97.7% of the village land was classified as Area A, 1.8% as Area B, and the remaining 0.5% as Area C.

A village council to administer Beit Imrin's civil affairs was established in 1966, with the first mayor being Ayad Youssef Abdel-Rahman Ahsan. The council consists of nine members including the mayor, who currently is Basheer Samarah.

References

Bibliography

 

 
 

Perlmann, Joel: The 1967 Census of the West Bank and Gaza Strip: A Digitized Version. Annandale-on-Hudson, N.Y.: Levy Economics Institute of Bard College. November 2011 – February 2012. [Digitized from: Israel Central Bureau of Statistics, Census of Population and Housing, 1967 Conducted in the Areas Administered by the IDF, Vols. 1–5 (1967–70), and Census of Population and Housing: East Jerusalem, Parts 1 and 2 (1968–70).]

External links
Welcome To Bayt Umrin
Survey of Western Palestine, Map 11:   IAA, Wikimedia commons
Beit Imrin Village Profile,   Applied Research Institute–Jerusalem (ARIJ)
Bayt Umrin (aerial photo), ARIJ
 Development priorities and needs in Beit Imrin, ARIJ

Nablus Governorate
Villages in the West Bank
Municipalities of the State of Palestine